Jesurun Uchegbulam (born 1 January 2001) is a Nigerian professional footballer who plays for English club Chesterfield, as a winger.

Early life
Uchegbulam was born in Lagos and moved to Italy as a young child. After his parents lost their jobs the family moved to England, when he was 15, settling in Harpurhey.

Career
Uchegbulam joined the youth team of AC Milan at the age of 7. After his family move to England, he had a trial with Everton, but he was not signed by the club after he had heart surgery. He also had trials with Sheffield Wednesday, Wigan Athletic, Brentford and Salford City.

He then spent time in non-league football with Stockport Town and Mossley, for whom he was named the fans' young player of the year in June 2020, having scored four goals in 32 league appearances for the club. He joined Matlock Town in May 2021, scoring 9 goals in 38 appearances for the Northern Premier League Premier Division club, before signing with Chesterfield in July 2022, his first professional contract. By September 2022 he was appearing for the club primarily as a substitute, and he scored his first goal for the club that month.

References

2001 births
living people
Nigerian footballers
A.C. Milan players
Stockport Town F.C. players
Mossley A.F.C. players
Matlock Town F.C. players
Chesterfield F.C. players
Northern Premier League players
National League (English football) players
Association football wingers
Nigerian expatriate footballers
Nigerian expatriates in Italy
Expatriate footballers in Italy
Nigerian expatriates in England
Expatriate footballers in England